Jan Nowicki (5 November 1939 – 7 December 2022) was a Polish actor.

Biography
He appeared in 90 films and television episodes since 1967.

Nowicki died on 7 December 2022, at the age of 83.

Selected filmography
 Bariera (1966)
 Colonel Wolodyjowski (1969)
 Family Life (1971)
 The Hour-Glass Sanatorium (1973)
 Women (1977)
 Spiral (1978)
 Just Like Home (1978)
 The Heiresses (1980)
 Diary for My Children (1984)
 O-Bi, O-Ba: The End of Civilization (1985)
 Diary for My Lovers (1987)
 Magnat (1987)
 A Tale of Adam Mickiewicz's 'Forefathers' Eve' (1989)
 Foetus (1994)
 The Seventh Chamber (1995)
 The Unburied Man (2004)

References

External links
 
 

1939 births
2022 deaths
Polish male film actors
Polish male stage actors
Recipients of the Silver Cross of Merit (Poland)
Recipients of the Gold Cross of Merit (Poland)
Recipients of the Gold Medal for Merit to Culture – Gloria Artis
Officer's Crosses of the Order of Merit of the Republic of Hungary (civil)
People from Włocławek County
20th-century Polish male actors
21st-century Polish male actors